Simon Fell may refer to:
 Simon H. Fell (1959–2020), English bassist and composer
 Simon Fell (politician), Conservative Party politician, MP for Barrow and Furness since 2019
 Simon Fell (Yorkshire Dales), a subsidiary summit of Ingleborough, a mountain in the Yorkshire Dales in Northern England